North East (Ward 21) is one of the 23 wards of Glasgow City Council. On its creation in 2007 and in 2012 it returned four council members, using the single transferable vote system. For the 2017 Glasgow City Council election, the ward boundaries were redrawn with a smaller size and population, and it returned three members.

Boundaries
Located in the far north-east of Glasgow, the core of the ward since 2007 includes neighbourhoods between the M8 motorway and the city boundary with North Lanarkshire: Easterhouse, Provanhall, Garthamlock, Craigend, Ruchazie, Hogganfield, Provanmill and Blackhill as well as the village of Gartloch, all bordered by open ground, much of which is within the Seven Lochs Wetland Park.

The 2017 changes removed the Robroyston, Barmulloch, Wallacewell and Balornock neighbourhoods located to the west of the M80 motorway, as well as the streets in Millerston within Glasgow, which were added to the Springburn ward. Following the alterations, it was the ward covering the largest area in the city, but with the lowest population spread the most thinly across the territory. A 2019 specific review caused the removal of a few streets of modern housing at Cardowan from the North East ward and the Glasgow council area, re-allocating them to the Stepps, Chryston and Muirhead ward of North Lanarkshire along with the rest of the developments in that area, addressing an anomaly dating back to when the boundary crossed open fields.

Councillors

Election results

2022 election
2022 Glasgow City Council election

2017 election
2017 Glasgow City Council election

2012 election
2012 Glasgow City Council election

2007 election
2007 Glasgow City Council election

See also
Wards of Glasgow

References

External links
Listed Buildings in North East Ward, Glasgow City at British Listed Buildings

Wards of Glasgow